Het Phoenix Mysterie  is a 1990 Dutch drama film directed by Leonard Retel Helmrich.

Cast
Luc Boyer ...  Architect Alhamy Albakry
Liz Snoyink ...  Wethouder Natasja Merckelbach
Manouk van der Meulen ...  Malou
Rutger Weemhoff ...  Johan Cooyman
Jake Kruyer ...  Frank Smulders
Martijn Oversteegen ...  Remon Dominicus
Berry van Oudheusden ...  Twan van Berkel
Koos Elfering ...  Sloper Mari
Hans Krosse ...  Wethouder
Jan Naaijkens ...  Directeur architectenbureau
Bram Wiersma ...  Poppenspeler
Roel den Ouden ...  Hotelbediende
Huub Mensen ...  Stationschef
Lieveke Roelofs ...  Toiletjuffrouw

External links 
 

1990 films
1990s Dutch-language films
1990 drama films
Dutch drama films
Films directed by Leonard Retel Helmrich